Carl-Axel Heiknert (10 September 1924 – 12 October 1981) was a Swedish actor. He appeared in more than twenty films and television shows between 1970 and 1981.

Selected filmography
 Gangsterfilmen (1974)
 The Man on the Roof (1976)
 Lyftet (1978)
 Poet and Muse (1978)

References

External links

1924 births
1981 deaths
20th-century Swedish male actors
Swedish male film actors
Swedish male television actors
People from Värnamo Municipality